The 2019–20 Liga IV Argeș (known as Liga Fortuna Sports for sponsorship reasons) was the 52nd season of the Liga IV Argeș, the fourth tier of the Romanian football league system. The season began on 24 August 2019 and was ended officially on 21 July 2020, after it was suspended in March 2020, due to COVID-19 pandemic in Romania. Voința Budeasa was crowned as county champion.

Team changes

To Liga IV Argeș
Relegated from Liga III
 —

Promoted from Liga V Argeș
 Vulturii Priboieni
 Rucăr

From Liga IV Argeș
Promoted to Liga III
 —

Relegated to Liga V Argeș
 Viitorul Ștefănești

Other changes
 Băiculești was excluded from Liga IV.
 Muscelul Câmpulung, Argeș Pitești II, Recea,  Aripi Pitești and FC Dănuț Coman were enrolled in Liga IV on demand.

League table

Promotion play-off

Champions of Liga IV – Argeș County face champions of Liga IV – Dâmbovița County and Liga IV – Dolj County.

Region 5 (South–West)

Group A

See also

Main Leagues
 2019–20 Liga I
 2019–20 Liga II
 2019–20 Liga III
 2019–20 Liga IV

County Leagues (Liga IV series)

 2019–20 Liga IV Alba
 2019–20 Liga IV Arad
 2019–20 Liga IV Bacău
 2019–20 Liga IV Bihor
 2019–20 Liga IV Bistrița-Năsăud
 2019–20 Liga IV Botoșani
 2019–20 Liga IV Brăila
 2019–20 Liga IV Brașov
 2019–20 Liga IV Bucharest
 2019–20 Liga IV Buzău
 2019–20 Liga IV Călărași
 2019–20 Liga IV Caraș-Severin
 2019–20 Liga IV Cluj
 2019–20 Liga IV Constanța
 2019–20 Liga IV Covasna
 2019–20 Liga IV Dâmbovița
 2019–20 Liga IV Dolj
 2019–20 Liga IV Galați 
 2019–20 Liga IV Giurgiu
 2019–20 Liga IV Gorj
 2019–20 Liga IV Harghita
 2019–20 Liga IV Hunedoara
 2019–20 Liga IV Ialomița
 2019–20 Liga IV Iași
 2019–20 Liga IV Ilfov
 2019–20 Liga IV Maramureș
 2019–20 Liga IV Mehedinți
 2019–20 Liga IV Mureș
 2019–20 Liga IV Neamț
 2019–20 Liga IV Olt
 2019–20 Liga IV Prahova
 2019–20 Liga IV Sălaj
 2019–20 Liga IV Satu Mare
 2019–20 Liga IV Sibiu
 2019–20 Liga IV Suceava
 2019–20 Liga IV Teleorman
 2019–20 Liga IV Timiș
 2019–20 Liga IV Tulcea
 2019–20 Liga IV Vâlcea
 2019–20 Liga IV Vaslui
 2019–20 Liga IV Vrancea

References

External links
 Official website 

Liga IV seasons
Sport in Argeș County